is a railway station on the Jōetsu Line in the city of Ojiya, Niigata, Japan, operated by the East Japan Railway Company (JR East).

Lines

Station layout
The station has one ground-level side platform and one island platform connected by a footbridge; however, one side of the island platform is not in use. The station has a Midori no Madoguchi staffed ticket office.

Platforms

History
The station opened on 1 November 1920, originally named  to distinguish it from the existing Ojiya Station on the Uonuma Railway. It was renamed simply Ojiya Station on 1 August 1932 after the Uonuma Railway station was renamed  in July 1932. With the privatization of Japanese National Railways (JNR) on 1 April 1987, the station came under the control of JR East.

Passenger statistics
In fiscal 2017, the station was used by an average of 1282 passengers daily (boarding passengers only).

Surrounding area
 
 
 Niigata Prefectural Ojiya High School

See also
 List of railway stations in Japan

References

External links

 Ojiya Station information (JR East) 

Railway stations in Niigata Prefecture
Railway stations in Japan opened in 1920
Stations of East Japan Railway Company
Jōetsu Line
Ojiya, Niigata